Microvirga arabica  is a Gram-negative bacterium from the genus of Microvirga which has been isolated from arid soil from the Hira Cave in Saudi Arabia.

References

External links
Type strain of Microvirga arabica at BacDive -  the Bacterial Diversity Metadatabase

Hyphomicrobiales
Bacteria described in 2017